Platforma HD was a Russian operator of satellite TV which broadcasts a package of HD-quality channels over the European territory of Russia. In addition, the package of channels of high-definition was available for retransmission in cable networks.

Channels
Platforma HD broadcasts the programs via satellite Eurobird 9A (9,0°E).

Main package (13 channels)
 3DV
 Sport 1
 Eurosport HD
 HD Life
 HD Sport
 High Life
 MTVNHD
 National Geographic HD
 Women's world
 Nat Geo Wild
 Kinopokaz HD-1
 Kinopokaz HD-2
 Тeleputeshestviya HD

Platform DV (22 channels)

Terrestrial
 Bibigon
 Kultura
 Muz-TV
 NTV (Russia)
 Channel 5 (St. Petersburg)
 REN TV
 Russia 1
 Russia 2
 Russia 24
 TNT (Russia)
 STS
 RBC TV

Thematic
 365 Days TV
 Zoo TV
 Auto Plus
 Kinopokaz
 Comedy TV
 Kitchen TV
 Teleputeshestvia
 Tonus TV
 Hunter & Fisherman
 24 Techno

Other available channels
Besides channels from the packages of Platform HD and Platform DV, every subscriber can receive the un-encrypted TV and radio channels free of charge.

Recommended equipment
For viewing channels in HD quality the company recommends to use the following receiving equipment:
Satellite:
 General Satellite HD-9300.
Cable:
 General Satellite HD-9320.
 General Satellite HD-9322.

Subscribing
You can receive Platform HD signal directly from the satellite or through the cable network.
 High-definition cable television Platform HDIn order to receive Platform HD through the cable network you should contact your cable operator. Here you can find a list of the cable providers transmitting the Platform HD.
 High-definition satellite television Platform HDIn order to receive Platform HD directly from the satellite, you need to choose an authorised dealer.

Satellite coverage parameters
In the European part of Russia Platform HD was available via satellite on Eurobird 9А.

Orbital slot
9 degrees east longitude

Broadcast parameters
Platform HD
 Transponder #84
Frequency:  12,380 MHz
Polarization:  Vertical (V)
Transmission standard:  DVB-S2
Modulation:  8PSK
Symbol rate:  26,400
FEC:  2/3
 Transponder #80
Frequency: 12,303 MHz
Polarization: Vertical (V)
Transmission standard: DVB-S2
Modulation: 8PSK
Symbol rate: 26,400
FEC: 2/3

Platform DV
 Transponder #75
Frequency: 12,207 MHz 
Polarization: Horizontal (H) 
Transmission standard: DVB-S2 
Modulation: 8PSK 
Symbol rate: 27,500 
FEC: 2/3

3D Television in Russia
In February 2010, Platform HD and its technological partners – General Satellite and Samsung Electronics – announced at the International professional exhibition CSTB 2010, they began working over the first 3D television project in Russia. However, the 3D channel is currently at a preparatory stage.

References

Television in Russia
Direct broadcast satellite services
Mass media in Saint Petersburg